The Abasto Shopping is one of the biggest shopping mall centers in Buenos Aires, Argentina. The building was the central wholesale fruit and vegetable market in the city ("Mercado de Abasto") from 1893 to 1984. Since 1999, it has served as a shopping mall. It is also famous for being in the area where the tango singer Carlos Gardel, known as El Morocho del Abasto ("the dark-haired guy from Abasto"), lived for most of his life. Today, the surrounding area, though part of the Balvanera neighbourhood, is sometimes referred to as Abasto.

The Abasto Shopping centre is served by the adjoining underground station Carlos Gardel of line B metro (subte).

History

By the end of the 19th century, the city of Buenos Aires was expanding rapidly due to the influx of migrants from various European countries. Because of the demographic change, and the demolition of the Mercado Modelo market near the Plaza Lorea, the Devoto brothers on August 16, 1888, proposed the construction of a supply market on the land they acquired in 1875 in the Balvanera neighbourhood. The land was near the Sarmiento railway and halfway between La Boca and Olivos, two zones of fruit and vegetable production.

The town hall accepted the proposal on November 29 of that year, and passed it on to the Deliberating Council, who sanctioned it on January 8, 1889, in an ordinance approving the construction of the Mercado Central de Abasto ("Central Supply Market") on the 25,000 m² plot of land between Corrientes Avenue, Lavalle, Anchorena and Laprida streets. The municipality allowed the Abasto market to become wholesalers of fruit, vegetables and other foodstuffs, but forbade the sale of meat.

The old marketeers of the Mercado Modelo associated and founded in 1889 the Sociedad Anónima Mercado de Abasto Proveedor ("Market Supply Provider Anonymous Society"), which bought from the Devoto brothers the land and the concession to build the Mercado de Abasto. The construction of the building started shortly after the sale had been approved by mayor Francisco Seeber, and the first section was inaugurated on April 1 of 1893, with a covered area of 1,300 m².

Ten years later a refrigerated storage and an ice factory were opened, to satisfy the city's hygiene standards of the times. Since the population, and with it consumer demand, was steadily growing, it was necessary to construct a parking area for horses and vehicles. In 1928 an annex for retail sale was built between Guardia Vieja, Lavalle, Gallo and Bustamante streets.

Consumer demand again led to the overcrowding of the markets of the city, so architects José Luis Delpini, Viktor Sulčič and Raúl Bes designed a new market in the location of the Abasto market. Work started on December 28 of 1931 with the foundations and finished in 1934. In 1939, the sale of meat and fish was allowed.

On October 14, 1984, the central market was moved to the present Mercado Central, location, outside the city of Buenos Aires, and the Abasto of Buenos Aires was closed and left abandoned. It was not until the mid-1990s that a project was proposed for turning the Abasto into a shopping mall. In 1996 the building was sold to IRSA, which restored the facade and remodeled and restored its interior. Abasto Shopping Centre was opened in 1999, and currently houses many locally known brands like Akiabara, Cuesta Blanca and Sarkany. A limited number of foreign brands can also be found such as Adidas, Lacoste and Nike

Gallery

External links

Abasto Shopping Pics

Balvanera
Shopping malls in Buenos Aires
Buildings and structures completed in 1934
1934 establishments in Argentina